Tyrannodoris ernsti is a species  of sea slug, a polycerid nudibranch, a marine gastropod mollusc in the family Polyceridae.

Distribution
This species was described from south-eastern to southern Brazil.

Description
Tyrannodoris ernsti is a predominantly dark green animal with yellow horizontal lines. The greyish gills and rhinophores are edged with dark blue. It reaches approximately 80 mm in length. Like other nudibranchs in the genus Tyrannodoris, it is carnivorous, feeding on other seaslugs.

References

Polyceridae
Gastropods described in 2014